Parasutterella excrementihominis is a Gram-negative, strictly anaerobic, non-spore-forming bacterium of the genus Parasutterella in the family  Sutterellaceae, isolated from human faeces.

References

External links
Type strain of Parasutterella excrementihominis at BacDive -  the Bacterial Diversity Metadatabase

Burkholderiales
Bacteria described in 2009